Lee Wo-shih (born 1 April 1960) is a Taiwanese politician. He was the Magistrate of Kinmen County from 20 December 2009 until 25 December 2014.

Political career
On 12 January 2008, he joined the 2008 Republic of China legislative election as an independent candidate from Kinmen constituency. However, he lost the election.

Kinmen County Magistrate

2009 Kinmen County Magistrate election
Lee was elected as the Magistrate of Kinmen County after winning the 2009 Republic of China local election under the Kuomintang on 5 December 2009 and took office on 20 December 2009.

Cross-strait marriages
On 10 October 2010, Li presided over a group of cross-strait marriages featuring several couples between Taiwanese and Chinese mainland people. The marriage was done to celebrate the national day of the Republic of China. The wedding ceremony featured traditional rites, such as parade floats and the couple sitting in palanquins and on horses.

Duty-free island Kinmen
In mid June 2013 speaking at an economic forum organized by Taiwan Competitiveness Forum and attended by people from Taiwan, Hong Kong and Mainland China, Li proposed Kinmen to be developed as duty-free island to boost tourism and the local economy. Kinmen can attract some of the 41.24 million tourists visiting the nearby Xiamen city last year to the island. Li had also asked the central ROC government to grant Chinese mainland tourists multiple-entry visas for Kinmen, and also asked Beijing to ease the current Kinmen one-day tour restrictions to two or three days.

Deminers memorial park opening ceremony
Speaking during the opening ceremony of a memorial park to commemorate the mine-laying activities in end of March 2014, Li said that Kinmen is no longer a place with full of buried mines, but it is a tourist spot featuring beautiful coastlines and historical relics from wartime.

Water supply from Mainland China
Speaking during the official visit of Fujian Communist Party Chief You Quan to Kinmen in mid July 2014, Li asked You for a drop in price of the water supply from Mainland China to Kinmen, in which it will connect Longhu Reservoir in Xiamen to Tienpu Reservoir in Kinmen. The current water price set by Mainland China is CNY 2 per 1,000 liters.

2014 Kinmen County Magistrate election
Lee lost to independent Chen Fu-hai in the 2014 Kinmen County magistrate election held on 29 November 2014.

References

1960 births
Living people
Magistrates of Kinmen County
Ming Chuan University alumni